Live European Tour is the first live album by Billy Preston, released in 1974 in Europe and Japan. It was recorded during his opening act stint for the Rolling Stones 1973 European Tour, featuring Mick Taylor on lead guitar and Preston's own band "The God Squad". In 2002, A&M Records released the album in Japan, featuring alternative song takes.

Track listing

Original release

Side one
 "Medley: Day Tripper/The Bus" (John Lennon, Paul McCartney; Preston, Joe Greene)
 "Let It Be" (Lennon, McCartney)
 "Let's Go Get Stoned" (Valerie Simpson, Nickolas Ashford, Jo Armstead)
 "Billy's Bag" (Preston)

Side two
 "Will It Go Round in Circles" (Preston, Bruce Fisher)
 "Outa-Space" (Preston, Greene)
 "Higher" (Vamp)
 "Get Back" (Lennon, McCartney)

2002 CD reissue

 "Day Tripper" (Lennon, McCartney) – 2:07
 "The Bus" (Preston, Greene) – 10:58
 "Let It Be" (Lennon, McCartney) – 2:28
 "Will It Go Round in Circles" (Preston, Fisher) – 3:44
 "Let's Go Get Stoned" (Simpson, Ashford, Armstead) – 1:36
 "Space Race" (Preston) – 1:57
 "Amazing Grace" (traditional; arranged by Preston) – 4:43
 "That's the Way God Planned It" (Preston) – 4:05
 "Outa-Space/Higher" (Preston, Greene) – 8:05

Personnel 

Billy Preston - all keyboards, melodica, lead vocals
Mick Taylor - guitars, backing vocals
Hubert Heard - keyboards
Kenneth Lupper - keyboards
Manuel Kellough - drums, percussion

Production

Billy Preston: Producer.
Andy Johns: Engineer.
Robert Ellis: Direction.
Bruce Wayne: Road Manager.
Roland Young: Art Direction.
Junie Osaki: Design.
Album remixed at A&M recording studios, Hollywood California.

References

Billy Preston albums
1974 live albums
A&M Records live albums